Gail Castro (born November 12, 1957) is an American former beach volleyball player. Between 1982 and 1990 she played 190 tournaments. After finishing second in the American trials with partner Deb Richardson, they competed in the women's tournament at the 1996 Summer Olympics. In 1997 she played her 11th WPVA tour. She has also played with Gayle Stammer.

She played indoor volleyball at Los Angeles Valley College and Cal State Long Beach.

References

External links
 
Bio at Beach Volleyball Hall of Fame

1957 births
Living people
American women's beach volleyball players
Olympic beach volleyball players of the United States
Beach volleyball players at the 1996 Summer Olympics
Sportspeople from Glendale, California
20th-century American women
Long Beach State Beach women's volleyball players